Nicole "Coco" Morier (lives in Los Angeles, California, United States) is an American singer-songwriter and producer. She began her career in 2002 as one half of the electronic rock duo Electrocute before becoming a songwriter for artists including Britney Spears, Tom Jones, Selena Gomez, Ellie Goulding, Demi Lovato, and Icona Pop. Her best-known compositions include "Heaven on Earth" and "How I Roll", recorded by Britney Spears, the latter of which was named the #1 song of 2011 by Rolling Stone.

As a songwriter Nicole has collaborated with the world's top songwriters and producers including Max Martin, Ryan Tedder, Stargate, and Bloodshy and Avant.

Biography

Morier was born in San Francisco but moved as a small child to Albuquerque, New Mexico. Her father Johnny Morier, was a folk musician and songwriter who'd written a few minor hits for bands in the Sixties, including Spanky and Our Gang's top 10 "Makin' Every Minute Count", The Cowsills' "Yesterday's Girl" and Sam the Sham and the Pharaohs' "Banned in Boston". He had also spent time playing the local folk circuit in Greenwich Village, NYC and had befriended musicians such as Joan Baez and Taj Mahal whom Nicole met as a child. With her father she began singing in churches and local venues and she learned to play an array of instruments.

Nicole first considered pursuing a career as a songwriter for other artists in 2006 when talking with musician-songwriter Greg Kurstin, while working on Electrocute's song "Bikini Bottom" for the SpongeBob SquarePants Movie soundtrack in Los Angeles. Kurstin had just begun writing songs for pop artists and introduced her to his publisher.

Morier soon after signed with music publishers Kobalt. and landed her first cut when "Heaven on Earth", a song she'd co-written with Freescha, was recorded by Britney Spears for her album Blackout.

Work
In 2009-2010 Morier toured as lead guitarist and backing vocalist with Charlotte Gainsbourg from 2009-2010.

In 2011, Morier released a self-titled solo EP as "Coco Morier." The five-song extended play album contains production from Miike Snow members Christian Karlsson and Pontus Winnberg as well as Freescha and Magnus Lidehall.

In 2012, Morier began the artist collective INGRID along with Miike Snow, Peter Bjorn and John, Lykke Li, members of the Teddybears and others.

Morier collaborated with Nick Ebeling on the Gunwolf Comic Book Soundtrack which was released through her label INGRID in October 2013. She executive-produced the album and contributed as writer and producer of 7 of the 16 tracks. The soundtrack was released as a package containing the first edition of Gunwolf Comic Book and a limited-edition tape cassette and later on picture disc.

In March 2014, Morier signed to OneRepublic vocalist and songwriter Ryan Tedder's publishing company Patriot Games in a joint deal with Brill Building Songs and Kobalt Music Publishing.

Shoe designer Jerome C. Rousseau as a fan of her music named two shoes from his fall collection of 2015 the "Coco" and the "Morier".

In 2016, V magazine called her "one of pop's best kept secrets" on the release of her debut solo album.

Morier composed the all original music for "For the Love of a Glove: An Unauthorized Musical Fable About the Life of Michael Jackson As Told By His Glove" which opened January 2020 in Los Angeles, California along with co-composers Drew Erickson and Max Townsley. The lyrics and book were written by the shows director Julien Nitzberg. Choreography was by Cris Judd and Bryan Anthony.  Cris Judd was Michael Jackson’s former lead dancer on the HIStory World Tour.  It was the premiere production at the Carl Sagan and Ann Druyan Theater in Los Angeles.

Andrew Limbong on NPR’s Weekend Edition called the show “Raunchy, surreal and absurd… While For the Love of a Glove isn't a hagiographic jukebox musical, it also isn't interested in tearing Michael Jackson down completely.” In his interview with him, Nitzberg told NPR, "He's the King of Pop… And theater usually deals with flawed kings, flawed gods, etc."

Discography

Songwriting discography

Solo discography

Albums

Extended plays

Singles

Guest appearances

Electrocute discography
Full-length albums and EPs
2003 - Tribute to Your Taste
2005 - Troublesome Bubblegum
2008 - On the Beat
2009 - Double Diamond

Singles
2003 - "Sugar Buzz"
2005 - "Shag Ball"
2005 - "Cops Copulating"
2008 - "Bad Legs"
2008 - "On The Beat"
2008 - "Mad Pursuit"
Other appearances
2004 - "Bikini Bottom" (on The SpongeBob SquarePants Movie soundtrack)
2008 - "Mad Pursuit" (Junkie XL featuring Electrocute) (on 21 soundtrack)

References

Living people
Singers from San Francisco
Synth-pop singers
American women singer-songwriters
Songwriters from San Francisco
1982 births
21st-century American singers
21st-century American women singers
Singer-songwriters from California